Cindy Beale (also Williams) is a fictional character from the BBC soap opera EastEnders, played by Michelle Collins. She first appeared 10 May 1988 and originally departed on 27 December 1990, before returning as one of the show's central antagonists from 13 October 1992 until her exit episode on 10 April 1998; the character died off-screen of childbirth on 5 November 1998.

During her time on the show, Cindy embarked on a prolonged relationship with her would-be husband Ian Beale (Adam Woodyatt). Their marriage soon deteriorated, however, due to Cindy's selfish streak that shows the character becoming unfaithful to Ian and growing more concerned about her own needs than their own children. She lies and schemes to ensure that she gets what she wants.

Storylines

Cindy Beale first arrives at Albert Square in May 1988, wherein she begins working on her mother's market stall selling hats. She dates barman Simon Wicks (Nick Berry), who is also seeing Donna Ludlow (Matilda Ziegler), leading Cindy and Donna to fight for Simon's attention. However, Cindy grows tired of Simon's womanising, and despite his feelings for her, she moves on to Ian Beale (Adam Woodyatt), who is becoming a successful entrepreneur. Initially she only wants to make Simon jealous but she and Ian start dating and by February 1989, they announce their engagement. Meanwhile, Simon retaliates by reconciling with Sharon Watts (Letitia Dean). However, while working together late one night at The Queen Victoria public house, Cindy and Simon have sex and Cindy becomes pregnant. She suggests leaving Ian for Simon but he refuses, not wanting to be tied down or upset his family so Cindy marries Ian, letting him think he is the baby's father, giving birth to Steven in December 1989. However, Simon decides he wants to be a father to his son and convinces Cindy to leave Ian, devastating him with the news that Steven is not his son and a feud erupts when he realises Simon is the father. Ian's behaviour grows erratic; after attempting suicide and failing, he chooses to ruin Simon's life instead so Simon decides to leave Walford with Cindy and Steven, leaving Ian heartbroken.

In 1992, Ian discovers that Simon has abandoned Cindy and Steven. Ian persuades her to return to Walford so he can help her bring Steven up. They reunite and Cindy gets pregnant in 1993. Richard Cole (Ian Reddington) is romantically interested in Cindy but she rejects him, so Richard tells people that he is the father of her twins. Everyone believes him, and Ian and Cindy almost separate but the truth emerges, just before Lucy and Peter are born in December. Married life and motherhood takes its toll on Cindy and she has two affairs, first with Matt (Toby Walton), a lifeguard, in 1994, and then with Simon's half-brother, David Wicks (Michael French), also Ian's half-brother, in 1995. Cindy and David meet secretly for a year and she falls in love with David, growing less and less tolerant of Ian. Suspecting Cindy is cheating, Ian hires a private investigator, who records Cindy and David in a clinch. Ian vows to take Cindy to court for custody of their children. David loses interest in Cindy so she takes drastic action and in October 1996, she hires John Valecue (Steve Weston), a hitman to kill Ian. Although she changes her mind, it is too late and Ian is shot, collapsing in a pool of blood in front of Cindy. The police suspect Cindy is involved and when David is called in for questioning, Cindy knows she will soon be arrested, so decides to flee with her children. Assisted by David and Barry Evans (Shaun Williamson), she collects her sons, but is unable to get Lucy, and is forced to leave without her. David also stays behind, promising Cindy that he will try to get Lucy and join her later, but he never does.

Ian's private investigator, Ros Thorne (Clare Grogan) tracks Cindy to Italy in 1997. Ian, Phil Mitchell (Steve McFadden) and Grant Mitchell (Ross Kemp) find her, and Phil and Grant abduct Steven and Peter while Ian claims he still loves Cindy and will forgive her. Desperate to get her daughter back, Cindy goes along with him but grows suspicious and calls the police, but it is too late. Despite a police chase, Ian brings his sons back to Walford. Cindy soon follows Ian back to Walford with her new boyfriend, Nick Holland (Dominic Taylor). She takes Ian to court for custody of the children and wins. However, while collecting her children, Cindy is arrested for conspiracy to murder when Ian's associates visit Valecue in prison while he is serving a life sentence for murder, and persuade him to tell the police about Cindy's involvement. Ian wins full custody of the children and Cindy is charged and remanded while she is pregnant by Nick. After realising Cindy is guilty, Nick leaves her without any money for a lawyer. On 5 November 1998, Ian receives news that Cindy has died in childbirth. Her daughter survives and is named Cindy by Ian, in her mother's honour. Custody is given to Cindy's sister, Gina Williams (Nicola Cowper).

Creation and development
Cindy was introduced in 1988 in a minor role as a love-interest for Simon Wicks (Nick Berry). She was due to appear in only eleven episodes but the character evolved. Writer Colin Brake has suggested that Cindy was "the most important character for the future" to be introduced in 1988, despite her low-key entrance.

Actress Michelle Collins was asked to audition for the part by the soap's co-creator, Julia Smith, who saw her perform on stage. Collins had previously auditioned for the role of original character Mary Smith, but at the time Julia Smith had decided they did not want that character to be from London, so that role went to Linda Davidson. Three years on, Collins won the role of Cindy. She has commented, "Cindy arrived for 11 episodes, working on a hat stall and as a tease for Wicksy, but evolved into a much juicier character. Julia Smith said it would change my life. I didn't believe her - how wrong I was."

In 2015, former executive producer Matthew Robinson explained in a blog post why he had Cindy killed off, saying that keeping her alive "might have benefited the show" but it would have required Collins to commit to three days of filming to depict the birth of Cindy's baby and the outcome of her trial, because "no proper producer could allow off-screen portrayal of massive soap events like those". However, Collins never committed to the episodes and Robinson had no choice but to kill the character off-screen.

See also
List of EastEnders characters (1988)
List of soap opera villains

References

External links 

Entry on orange.co.uk's Top 10 TV bitches
"Michelle Collins 'glad Cindy Beale died'."

Fictional criminals in soap operas
Fictional female businesspeople
Television characters introduced in 1988
Female characters in television
Female villains
Beale family (EastEnders)
Fictional prisoners and detainees